Oswaldo Cochrane Filho (29 July 1933 – 9 December 2020) was a Brazilian water polo player. He competed in the men's tournament at the 1964 Summer Olympics.

Oswaldo started swimming at Fluminense at the age of 12. In 1952, aged 19, he joined the club's water polo team that went undefeated for 104 games (from 1952 to 1961). He defended his national team for the first time in 1955 until he retired after the 1971 Pan American Games.

He died from COVID-19 during the COVID-19 pandemic in Brazil.

References

External links
 

1933 births
2020 deaths
Brazilian male water polo players
Olympic water polo players of Brazil
Water polo players at the 1964 Summer Olympics
Water polo players from Rio de Janeiro (city)
Deaths from the COVID-19 pandemic in Rio de Janeiro (state)
20th-century Brazilian people